Mad Mouse was a very compact roller coaster located at the Myrtle Beach Pavilion. Built by Arrow Dynamics in 1998, Mad Mouse was the first of 4 "Mad Mouse" design models installed by Arrow Dynamics (the other three being at Cedar Fair parks, which are Michigan's Adventure, Valleyfair, and California's Great America, in which that one is called Psycho Mouse). The ride cost a modest $2,000,000 and was a part of a 2 roller coaster expansion in 2 years (the other being Hurricane in 2000). The ride closed with the Pavilion on September 30, 2006. It is currently up for sale by Parc Management, LLC.

Former roller coasters in South Carolina
Wild Mouse roller coasters